The 2003–04 season was Bihor Oradea's 45th season in the Romanian football league system, and their 18th season in the Divizia A. At the end of the season the team finished on 16th place and relegated back to Divizia B, after only one season in the top flight of the Romanian football. During this season the club was known as FC Oradea.

First team squad

Pre-season and friendlies

Competitions

Divizia A

Result round by round

Results

Cupa României

See also

2003–04 Cupa României
Divizia A

Notes and references

FC Bihor Oradea seasons
FC Bihor Oradea